Alfredo Boccolini (29 December 1885 - 5 February 1956) was an Italian actor. He appeared in more than ten films from 1917 to 1939.

Selected filmography

References

External links 

1885 births
1956 deaths
Italian male film actors